Marcus Spencer Hummon (born December 28, 1960) is an American country music artist. He is the father of country singer Levi Hummon.

Early life
Hummon was born in Washington, D.C.. He graduated from Williams College.

Career
After several years of playing in various bands, he moved to Nashville where he was signed to a songwriting contract. A record deal with Columbia Records soon followed. His debut album All in Good Time in 1995 produced a No. 73 single on the Hot Country Songs charts with "God's Country." From 1999-2001, Hummon was a member of the alternative country band The Raphaels along with former Big Country lyricist and guitarist Stuart Adamson. The Raphaels only release was 1998's Supernatural on Track Records. Hummon also released several studio albums on his own label, Velvet Armadillo.

In 2006, his composition "Bless the Broken Road" co-written with Jeff Hanna and Bobby Boyd in 1994, won a Grammy Award for Best Country Song. Hanna's Nitty Gritty Dirt Band recorded the song. Later Hummon recorded his own version followed by Melodie Crittenden, the Grammy-winning version by Rascal Flatts, and Selah in a version with Melodie Crittenden.

Hummon has also co-written songs for many country music artists, including Top 40 singles for Tim McGraw, Wynonna Judd, and Alabama as well as three Number One country hits: "Cowboy Take Me Away" by the Dixie Chicks, "Born to Fly" by Sara Evans, and the Rascal Flatts version of "Bless the Broken Road".

Hummon co-produced Last of the Good Guys, the debut album for the country group One Flew South in addition to co-writing several of the songs on it.

List of singles composed by Marcus Hummon
Alabama – "The Cheap Seats"
Suzy Bogguss – "No Way Out"
Dixie Chicks – "Ready to Run", "Cowboy Take Me Away"
Sara Evans – "Born to Fly"
Hal Ketchum – "Every Little Word"
Wynonna Judd – "Only Love"
Lauren Lucas – "What You Ain't Gonna Get"
Tim McGraw – "One of These Days"
One Flew South – "My Kind of Beautiful"

SHeDAISY – "Get Over Yourself"
Steve Wariner – "Road Trippin'"
Western Flyer – "Friday Night Stampede"
Bryan White – "Love Is the Right Place"
Chely Wright – "Jezebel"

Hummon previously recorded "Bless the Broken Road" and "One of These Days" on his 1995 debut album All in Good Time.

Discography

Albums

Singles

Music videos

References

External links
Official website

1960 births
American country harmonica players
American country singer-songwriters
Grammy Award winners
Living people
Williams College alumni
Place of birth missing (living people)
Singer-songwriters from Washington, D.C.